Michael Edward Oliver Lambart, 12th Earl of Cavan,  (29 October 1911 – 17 November 1988) was a hereditary peer. He succeeded his father in 1950.

Lord Cavan was educated at Radley College, a public school for boys in Oxfordshire.

He was commanding officer of the Shropshire Yeomanry between 1955 and 1958.

He married Essex Lucy Cholmondeley, daughter of Henry Arthur Cholmondeley and Helen Mary Wrigley, on 10 April 1947.

As he had no sons, the title passed from him to a distant cousin, Roger Cavan Lambart, a descendant of the 7th Earl.

References

1911 births
1988 deaths
People educated at Radley College
Deputy Lieutenants of Shropshire
British Army personnel of World War II
King's Shropshire Light Infantry officers
Shropshire Yeomanry officers
Earls of Cavan